The 1951 All-Pacific Coast football team consists of American football players chosen by the Associated Press (AP) and the United Press (UP) as the best college football players by position in the Pacific Coast region during the 1951 college football season. The AP selections included separate offensive and defensive units and were based on the consensus views of "football experts and coaches throughout the Pacific Coast." The UP selections did not include a separate defensive unit and were made by the region's coaches.

The 1951 Stanford Indians football team won the Pacific Coast Conference championship with a 9–2 record. Stanford dominated the AP selections with six players, three on offense and three on defense.

Two Pacific Coast players, end Bill McColl of Stanford and guard Les Richter of California, were also consensus picks on the 1951 All-America college football team.

Five of the players named to the first team were later inducted into the College Football Hall of Fame: McColl, Richter, and backs Frank Gifford of USC, Ollie Matson of the University of San Francisco, and Hugh McElhenny of Washington State.

Selections

Backs
 Gary Kerkorian, Stanford (AP-1 [offense]; UP-1)
 Frank Gifford, USC (AP-1 [offense]; UP-1)
 Ollie Matson, San Francisco (AP-1 [offense]; UP-1)
 Hugh McElhenny, Washington (AP-1 [offense]; UP-1)
 Don Klosterman, Loyola (UP-2)
 Paul Cameron, UCLA (UP-2)
 Eddie Macon, Pacific (UP-2)
 Ed Brown, San Francisco (UP-2)
 Dick Horn, Stanford (UP-3)
 Dave Mann, Oregon State (UP-3)
 Harry Hugasian, Stanford (UP-3)
 Bob Mathias, Stanford (UP-3)

Ends
 Bill McColl, Stanford (AP-1 [offense]; UP-1)
 Ed Barker, Washington State (AP-1 [offense]; UP-1)
 Ron Eadie, Stanford (AP-1 [defense])
 Fred Snyder, Loyola (UP-2)
 Ernie Stockert, UCLA (UP-2)
 Don Steinbrunner, Washington State (AP-1 [defense]; UP-3)
 Bob St. Claire, San Francisco (UP-3)

Tackles
 Herman Clark, Oregon State (AP-1 [offense]; UP-1)
 Hal Mitchell, UCLA (UP-1)
 Gino Marchetti, San Francisco (AP-1 [defense]; UP-2)
 Al Kirkland, Stanford (AP-1 [defense])
 Burl Toler, San Francisco (UP-2)
 Charley Ane, USC (UP-3)
 Bob Karpe, California (AP-1 [offense]; UP-3)

Guards
 Les Richter, California (AP-1 [offensive guard and linebacker]; UP-1)
 Pat Cannamela, USC (UP-1)
 Norm Manoogian, Stanford (AP-1 [offense]; UP-2)
 Charles Essegian, Stanford (AP-1 [defense])
 Ted Holzknecht, Washington (UP-2)
 Duane Putnam, Pacific (AP-1 [defense]; UP-3)
 Elmer Wilhoite, USC (UP-3)

Centers
 Charles Harris, California (AP-1 [offense]; UP-1)
 Donn Moomaw, UCLA (AP-1 [defense, linebacker]; UP-2)
 Bob Holder, Idaho (UP-3)

Defensive backs
 Dick Lemmon, California (AP-1 [defensive halfback])
 George Shaw, Oregon (AP-1 [defensive halfback])
 Johnny Williams, USC (AP-1 [safety])

Key
AP = Associated Press
UP = United Press

See also
1951 College Football All-America Team

References

All-Pacific Coast Football Team
All-Pacific Coast football teams
All-Pac-12 Conference football teams